The Corbu is a right tributary of the river Bistricioara in Romania. It flows into the Bistricioara in the village Corbu.

References

Rivers of Romania
Rivers of Harghita County